Anthony Maras is a multi award-winning Greek-Australian film director, writer and producer born in Adelaide, South Australia.

Maras' debut feature film Hotel Mumbai explores the 2008 Mumbai terror attacks and stars Dev Patel, Armie Hammer, Nazanin Boniadi, Anupam Kher and Jason Isaacs. The film enjoyed strong critical and audience acclaim and had its international theatrical release in 2019 after its world premiere at the 2018 Toronto International Film Festival. The film was shot both on location in Mumbai and in Maras' native Australia.

Maras' short film The Palace about the 1974 Turkish invasion of Cyprus, was shot along the United Nations Green in Nicosia, and premiered at the 2011 Telluride Film Festival and won multiple awards internationally including Best Short Fiction Film and Best Screenplay in a Short Film at the 2012 Australian Academy of Cinema and Television Arts Awards (AACTA Awards).

This marks Maras' third AACTA Award, having won Best Short Fiction Film for his previous film, the crime drama Spike Up. Maras was also nominated for the same award for his first film Azadi, one of the first Australian films exploring the plight of Afghan refugees in Australian detention centers. The film was partially shot on location in the remote deserts of outback Australia, at the Baxter and Woomera Detention centers where protests became mass riots involving the escape of hundreds of detainees, which Maras captured on camera and integrated into the finished movie.

Anthony also worked as an associate producer on Last Ride (2009), the debut feature of Palme d'Or winning director Glendyn Ivin and starring Hugo Weaving.

Maras original family surname is Mamatas, the family originating from the Greek island of Ikaria. He is a cousin to American author Nick Mamatas and popular Greek folk singer Eleftheria Arvanitaki.

References

External links 

2007 AFI Awards Acceptance Speech – YouTube

Australian film directors
Australian film producers
Australian film editors
Australian people of Greek descent
People from Adelaide
Living people
Year of birth missing (living people)